The Division of Bonner is an Australian Electoral Division in Queensland, located in the eastern suburbs of Brisbane, including the suburbs of Chandler, Carindale, Manly, Mount Gravatt, Wishart and Wynnum.

Geography
Federal electoral division boundaries in Australia are determined at redistributions by a redistribution committee appointed by the Australian Electoral Commission. Redistributions occur for the boundaries of divisions in a particular state, and they occur every seven years, or sooner if a state's representation entitlement changes or when divisions of a state are malapportioned.

History

The division was created in 2004 and is named after Neville Bonner, the first Aboriginal Australian person to serve in the Australian Parliament. Bonner served in the federal Senate as a Queensland Liberal Senator.

The seat had a notional Labor majority when it was created, but was won by the Liberal Party in 2004 by a slight margin. Kerry Rea regained the seat for Labor in 2007. Then Ross Vasta re-took the seat for the LNP at the 2010 election.

Members

Election results

References

External links
 Division of Bonner (Qld) — Australian Electoral Commission

Electoral divisions of Australia
Constituencies established in 2004
2004 establishments in Australia
Federal politics in Queensland